Glucocorticoid modulatory element-binding protein 1 is a protein that in humans is encoded by the GMEB1 gene.

Function 

This gene is a member of KDWK gene family. The product of this gene associates with GMEB2 protein, and the complex is essential for parvovirus DNA replication. Study of rat homolog implicates the role of this gene in modulation of transactivation by the glucocorticoid receptor bound to glucocorticoid response elements. Two alternative spliced transcript variants encoding different isoforms exist.

Interactions 

GMEB1 has been shown to interact with TRIM63.

References

Further reading